Shehnai is a Pakistani drama series that premiered on ARY Digital on 18 March 2021. Directed by Ahmed Bhatti, it is a production of iDream Entertainment. It has Ramsha Khan and Affan Waheed in lead roles.

Meerab and Bakht's life is ruled by their parents. Both of them are forced to marry each other. So they plan to cancel their wedding by teaming up together

Episodes

Cast 
 Ramsha Khan as Bakht
 Affan Waheed as Meerab
 Maham Amir as Samreen
 Arsalan Faisal as Rafay
 Zainab Qayyum as Maleeha
 Javed Sheikh as Absar a.k.a. Baray Bhaiya
 Behroz Sabzwari as Azhar; Bakht's chcha (parental uncle)
 Samina Ahmed as Dadi; Absar and Azhar's mother
 Maryam Noor as Saima
 Umer Aalam as Ahsan
 Javeria Abbasi as Munni
 Nida Mumtaz as Ambreen; Bakht's mother
 Salma Hassan as Tooba
 Hammad Shoaib as Hunain
 Sajid Shah as Hunain's father
 Shehryar Zaidi as Zubair; Meerab's father
 Saleem Mairaj as Kfayat a.k.a. Kaffi
 Anam Tanveer as Beena; Meerab's sister
 Nida Hussain as Beenish; Tooba and Kfayat's daughter
 Sumaiyya Bukhsh as Shama
 Anosha Ali as Iffat; Maleeha and Azhar's daughter
 Nabeela Khan as Bushr; Beena and Meerab's mother
 Naima Khan as Saiqa; Saima's mother
 Zohaib Mirza as Meesam; Iffat's friend

Soundtrack

The original soundtrack of the serial is performed by Asim Azhar and Nehal Naseem. The music was composed by Qasim Azhar and Hassan Ali while lyrics were also written by Qasim Azhar and Hassan Ali.

Production 
The show was earlier titled Aur Yun Pyar Hogya, later it changed to Shaadi Mubarak and then finally Shehnai was selected as a title when the first look was unveiled on 2 March 2021. The first and second teaser released on 5 March 2021 while the third teaser released on 6 March 2021.

References

External links 
 Official website

Pakistani drama television series
2021 Pakistani television series debuts
Pakistani television series
Urdu-language television shows